The "Icherisheher" State Historical-Architectural Reserve Department was established in accord with presidential order No 629, dated 10 February 2005, under the Ministers` Cabinet of Azerbaijan.

In 2017, the Department was separated by order of the Ministers' Cabinet. The Department has been established to create management system including the functions of central and local executive authorities, to preserve the historical monuments located in the territory of Icherisheher, investigate those monuments, to ensure their restoration. The Department has its own independent balance, state property, relevant treasury and bank accounts, seal with its name, relevant stamps and forms, and is funded from the state budget.

Overview
"Icherisheher" State Historical-Architectural Reserve Department is guided by Azerbaijan`s Constitution, laws, presidential decrees and orders, as well as decrees and orders of the Ministers `Cabinet, Statute on "Icherisheher" State Historical-Architectural Reserve. A historical and architectural reserve museum Shirvanshahs` Palace Complex and Maiden Tower, located in the territory of department, are under the Ministry of Culture and Tourism of Azerbaijan.

The Administration and other divisions of the Department constitute the single unit of the Department. The Department manages its activities directly and through those agencies. President of Azerbaijan approves the structure of the Administration and determines the number of employees of the apparatus. The activity of the Department is headed by the chief, appointed by the president of Azerbaijan. The Chief of the Department is responsible for fulfilment of the tasks entrusted to the Department and implementation of the rights. The head of the Department has two deputies appointed/dismissed by the president of Azerbaijan. Deputy Chiefs of the Department fulfil the duties entrusted to them by the Chief of the Department.

The Chief of "Icherisheher" State Historical-Architectural Reserve Department organizes and manages the activity of the Department, approves the statutes of the structural units and divisions of the Departments, appoints and dismisses employees and heads of divisions of the Department, issues orders and decrees, which are obligatory for execution in accordance with the legislation, organizes and supervises the execution of normative legal acts.

Activity direction and rights of the Department
Activity directions of "Icherisheher" State Historical-Architectural Reserve Department are as follows:

 Participates in the formation of uniform state policy in the field of reserves and ensures the implementation of this policy; 
 Organizes prediction and planning activities for reserves and ensures development of reserves; 
 Provides the scientific, historical and cultural researches of the monuments located in the territory of the reserves; organizes their purposeful use and ensures their protection; 
 Protects the structure of monuments located in the territory of the reserve, provides restoration and inviolability of the monuments; 
 Ensures expertise of projects designed for renovation, reconstruction, construction, reconstruction and rehabilitation works carried out in the territory of reserves, approves their implementation and monitors progress. 

The Department has rights:

 To request a report on the research works carried out by legal entities and individuals who are engaged in excavation works in the territory of the Reserve;
 To create mandatory instructions and to take appropriate action in order to eliminate violations in the process of using and protecting the territory of the Reserve
 To prepare proposals for increasing the level of building-upgrade, renovation, rehabilitation, restoration, regeneration works and their adaptation.
 To approve repair work that can create any danger to the monuments located in the territory.
 To approve research and propagation (advertising placement, audiovisual shooting, etc.) of monuments located in the territory of the Reserve;
 To prepare or participate in drafting the legislative acts concerning the field of reserve;
 To make an initiative to support the international agreements of Azerbaijan concerning the field of reserve;
 To send inquiries to state and local self-governing bodies, individuals and legal entities for obtaining information(relevant documents);
 To halt archaeological and other excavation works in the territory of the Reserves;
 To provide compulsory instruction on elimination of violations in the protected area and take relevant measures;
 To agree on the construction and maintenance works that do not endanger any monuments;
 To create budget that does not contradict the legislation by creating structures and facilities that provide temporary and permanent services in the area

Duties of the Department
Duties of "Icherisheher" State Historical-Architectural Reserve Department include to carry out normative regulation concerning the reserves and to ensure development and implementation of state programs and development concepts in the field of the reserves within its competence; to prepare and implement programs for management of reserves; to coordinate other executive authorities`activities which are related to reserves; and to ensure the fulfilment of international agreements which Azerbaijan joined; to provide state control over the reserves; to ensure the protection of historical and cultural monuments located on the territory of the Reserve and the maintenance of a regime for the territorial regime, to organize permanent protection of protected objects, to take appropriate measures to ensure functional design, architectural and aesthetic appearance and longevity of historical and cultural monuments.

The Department publishes different scientific and public literature. It also defines security measures related to reconstruction works that may cause any danger to the monuments, provides prevention of violation of the protection regime, informs the relevant state authorities about persons who have committed a violation, ensures the state registration of the discovered historical and cultural monuments, takes measures to ensure architectural-aesthetic appearance and longevity.

The structure of the Department
"Icherisheher" State Historical-Architectural Reserve Department includes Housing and Maintenance Service, Workshop for scientific production and restoration work, Scientific and Cultural Center, Shirvanshahs` Palace Complex and Gala historic-architectural reserve museums.

The Housing and Maintenance Service was established for construction and rehabilitation works that carried out in the territory. In parallel, the division carries out sanitary, cleaning and planting works, as well as housing maintenance. 

The Icherisheher Historical Museum enlightens the public about Icherisheher (Old City), which was included in the list of UNESCO World Heritage sites. The museum also collects and protects the national artefacts of the Old City.

Shirvanshahs’ Palace Complex museum provides preservation, studying and propagation of the monuments, architecture, culture, trading relations of the medieval feudal state Shirvanshahs. Gala State Historical-Ethnographic Reserve was established in accordance with the Resolution No 135 of the Council of Ministers of Azerbaijan SSR dated April 18, 1988.

Workshop for scientific production and restoration work designs rehabilitation and regeneration projects for the monuments located in the territory of Reserve, investigates the causes of their deformation and destruction.

Scientific and Cultural Center organizes and carries out scientific, historical and cultural studies of architecture, historical and cultural monuments of the territory. It also organizes cultural and public events to stimulate the interest in development and promotion of national culture.

Gallery

See also
 Palace of the Shirvanshahs

References

2007 establishments in Azerbaijan
Organizations established in 2007
Organizations based in Baku
Government agencies of Azerbaijan
World Heritage Sites in Azerbaijan